Jade Louise Lally (born 30 March 1987) is a British track and field athlete. She won a bronze medal for England in the women's discus at the 2014 Commonwealth Games, and represented Great Britain at the 2016 Rio Olympics. Her personal best is 65.10m set at the New South Wales Open Championships (AUS) on 27th February 2016.

Jade is also an indoor rowing competitor and world championship medalist. She finished in 2nd place at the 2022 WRICH in the 500m open sprint event with a time of 1:28.7. She currently holds the British records in the 100m, 1 minute and 500m.

Career
Born in Tooting, Lally grew up on Phipps Bridge Estate and attended Bishopsford Community High School. Lally began athletics as a high jumper. This began her interest in the sport and led to her joining her first club, Hercules Wimbledon AC, where she took up discus throwing. At the English Schools' Athletics Championships, she finished sixth in 2004, and seventh in 2005, before going on to win the 2006 AAA Junior Championships title, with a distance of 46.60.

Lally won a bronze medal at the 2009 European U23 Championships in the discus throw, with a throw of 54.44 metres. She won the 2010 British Championships. went on to represent England at that years Commonwealth Games, where she finished sixth in the discus throw. In 2011, she won both the British and English Championships.

Lally retained her English in 2012, and went on to compete at that years European Championships, being knocked out in the discus throw competition in qualifying after her second-worst performance of the year, finishing 22nd. This was her first senior British international competition. She was overlooked for selection to go to what would have been a home Olympics despite achieving two B standard qualifying marks and finishing in the top two at the British Championships.

At the European Team Championships, Lally finished sixth in 2013, and eighth in 2014. before going on to win a bronze medal at the 2014 Commonwealth Games in Glasgow in the discus throw, with a throw of 60.48 metres.

After winning her fourth British and English Championship titles in 2015, Lally broke the English discus record with a throw of 64.22 metres at the Auckland Track Challenge on 25 February 2016, then improved it to 65.10 metres at the New South Wales Championships on 27 February 2016. This performance ranks her second on the British all-time list behind Scotland's Meg Ritchie. She also holds the British indoor discus throw record holder, with a mark of 58.97 metres from the World Indoor Throws in Vaxjo, Sweden in 2013. and holds two club records in Under 23 and Senior discus at Shaftesbury Barnet Harriers.

Personal life
Lally was expecting her first child, due in August 2019. In April 2019 she spoke about her pregnancy as an athlete.

International competitions

References

External links
 

1987 births
Living people
People from Tooting
Athletes from London
English female discus throwers
British female discus throwers
Olympic female discus throwers
Olympic athletes of Great Britain
Athletes (track and field) at the 2016 Summer Olympics
Commonwealth Games bronze medallists for England
Commonwealth Games medallists in athletics
Athletes (track and field) at the 2014 Commonwealth Games
Athletes (track and field) at the 2018 Commonwealth Games
World Athletics Championships athletes for Great Britain
British Athletics Championships winners
Medallists at the 2014 Commonwealth Games